"It's Only Make Believe" is a song written by drummer Jack Nance and Mississippi-born singer Conway Twitty, while both were touring across Ontario, Canada in 1958. The song was recorded on May 7 for MGM Records; produced by Jim Vienneau, it featured Floyd “Lightnin’” Chance on double bass. It was released on side B of "I'll Try" on July 14, 1958. Known as Harold Lloyd Jenkins until changing his name in 1957, Twitty was a relatively unknown rock n' roll singer at the time. That all changed when side B finally hit the chart in September, then made No. 1 twice, on November 10 and 24. The single topped both U.S. and the UK Singles Chart, and became the only No. 1 pop single of his career. Years later, on a segment of 'Pop Goes The Country', Twitty stated it was a hit in 22 countries, and sold over 8 million copies. He did not become a country music star until he crossed over in 1966.

Though Twitty recorded subsequent versions of "It's Only Make Believe", his original 1958 hit never entered the Country & Western charts. He recorded a 1970 duet with Loretta Lynn, on their first collaborative album, We Only Make Believe. Twitty joins in on the last verse in a 1988 uptempo cover by Ronnie McDowell, which was a  No. 8 hit on the country music charts. Additionally, Twitty contributed to an alternative cover by McDowell.

Chart performance

Conway Twitty version

All-time charts

Cover versions

In 1964, Billy Fury had a UK No. 10 hit with his version, which also went to No. 1 in Singapore.
Glen Campbell's 1970 recording for The Glen Campbell Goodtime Album became a top ten hit in both the United States and United Kingdom.
Ronnie McDowell had a No. 8 single on the Billboard country chart in 1988 after recording the song as a duet with Twitty.
The pop band Child released the song as a single in 1978, reaching the top ten in the UK Charts.
Canadian country music singer Carroll Baker covered the song on her 1991 compilation Her Finest Collection. It was released as the album's first single and peaked at number 28 on the RPM Country Tracks chart.

Chart performance

Glen Campbell version

Year-end chart

See also
List of number-one singles from the 1950s (UK)
List of Hot 100 number-one singles of 1958 (U.S.)
List of UK Singles Chart Christmas number ones

References

1958 singles
1970 singles
1987 singles
Conway Twitty songs
Glen Campbell songs
Ronnie McDowell songs
Carroll Baker songs
Billboard Hot 100 number-one singles
Cashbox number-one singles
UK Singles Chart number-one singles
Songs written by Conway Twitty
MGM Records singles
Capitol Records singles
Curb Records singles
1958 songs
Billy Fury songs
Schlager songs
Christmas number-one singles in the United Kingdom
1950s ballads